Korita is a village in the municipality of Bileća, Republika Srpska, Bosnia and Herzegovina.

In 1924 Serbs massacred 42 Bosniaks here. During June 3 and 4, 1941, Ustaše massacred 130 ethnic Serbs in the village.

References

Populated places in Bileća